Héctor Scandolli (born in Buenos Aires, Argentina) is an Argentine former footballer who played as a forward for Clubs of Argentina and Chile.

Teams
 River Plate 1957–1958
 Estudiantes de La Plata 1959–1964
 Rangers 1965–1970

External links
 

Living people
Argentine footballers
Footballers from Buenos Aires
Association football forwards
Chilean Primera División players
Argentine Primera División players
Estudiantes de La Plata footballers
Club Atlético River Plate footballers
Rangers de Talca footballers
Argentine expatriate footballers
Argentine expatriate sportspeople in Chile
Expatriate footballers in Chile
Year of birth missing (living people)